Vellottamparappu is a panchayat town in Erode district in the Indian state of Tamil Nadu.

Demographics
 Indian census, Vellottamparappu had a population of 8129 which included equal numbers of male and female. Children below age 6 have a ratio of 8% of the total population. Vellottamparappu has an average literacy rate of 64%, which is higher than the national average of 59.5%. Literacy in males is higher than that of the females.
Sakthi poultry farm is the best farm at Vellotamparappu.

Economy
The population mostly consists of farmers and agricultural laborers who are dependent on the Kalingarayan canal.
The main crops are turmeric, paddy, sugarcane, maize, ginger, etc. Although the yield is good, the people are suffering mainly due to the lower prices for their products.

Facilities
The village has a public Higher Secondary school that has achieved 100% results in the SSLC examination over the last few years. 

The village has a small library that houses more than 1,000 books and various periodicals. It is used by the students and the local people.

Naduppalayam, which is a nearby village, has a market that opens every Thursday.

The Kundam festival, which occurs annually in January and February, is very famous in the area.

Subdivisions
This village holds the small towns of Perumampalayam, Periyur, Arikarankattur, Thitukattur, Vellapampalayam, Anaigoundan Pudur, Devampalayam, Naduppalayam, Devampalayam, Annamar Kovil and Vaduganur.

Arikkarankattur is a small village near by Vellottamparappu

References

Cities and towns in Erode district